Migma Shelter (stylized in all caps), is a Japanese alternative idol girl group that formed in 2017. They released their debut single, "Svaha Eraser", on July 15, 2017.

History
On August 9, 2016, Koji Tanaka and Hiroaki Taniyama began recruiting members for a new idol girl group. In October, Amari and Kotejun became the first two members of the group.

In January 2017, former Bellring Shōjo Heart member Yoneko (formerly Kanra) joined the line-up. Seisei, Mimimiyu and Komachi also joined the line-up in late January. On March 5, the group's name was finalised as Migma Shelter. On July 15, the group debuted with the single "Svaha Eraser". On October 13, the group released the limited single "Amazing Glow". On October 29, Popo Popo Po Popo Jr. was revealed as a new member. On December 27, the group's first EP, Orbit EP, was released. On December 31, Yoneko announced that she would graduate from the group on February 10, 2018. On March 31, Seisei graduated from the group. On May 27, it was announced that the group would go hiatus from July 8 in order to find new members. On July 8, Amari, Kotejun, Komachi and Popo Popo Po Popo Jr. graduated from the group. Before going on hiatus it was announced that a new member named Brazil would join the line-up.

On February 26, 2019, new members Shyshyko, Tamane, Yubune and Misonee joined the group. On March 19, the group released the single "Parade's End". On April 19, former There There Theres member, Arisaka Reina joined the group using the name Rere. On May 21, Misonee went on hiatus. On July 4, Shyshyko withdrew from the group. On July 16, "Names", was released. On September 7, Nananara joined the group. On October 15, "Tokyo Square" was released.

On June 12, 2020, Misonee who had been on hiatus graduated from the group. On August 26, the group's first album, Alice, was released.  On December 23, "Paralyzing" was released. On July 20, 2021, "Coro Da Noite" was released. On June 7, 2022, Yubune graduated from the group. On August 9, "Redo", was released. On December 18, former HO6LA member Wanya+ and former Dolly Kiss member Yuinon joined the group. Nananara graduated from the group on December 30.

Members

Current

Former
 (formerly )

Timeline

Discography

Studio albums

Extended plays

Singles

References

Japanese girl groups
Japanese idol groups
Japanese pop music groups
Musical groups from Tokyo
Musical groups established in 2017
2017 establishments in Japan